Anna Smaill (born April 1979) is a New Zealand poet and novelist, and a former violinist.

Early life and education
Smaill was born in Auckland in 1979. She started playing the violin aged seven. She studied musical performance at the University of Canterbury in the late 1990s and during her time at Canterbury, she decided to not become a professional violinist, but pursue a career in writing instead. She began studying English and music theory, before changing to the University of Auckland, from where she graduated with a master's degree in English. She spent the following year in Wellington at Victoria University of Wellington, graduating with a masters in creative writing from the International Institute of Modern Letters. She lived in Tokyo, Japan, from 2004 to 2006. Smaill started a PhD in contemporary American poetry at University College London in the United Kingdom, and finished it after returning to live in Wellington in 2013. She was a lecturer in creative writing at the University of Hertfordshire from 2009 to 2012.

Writing
Smaill was included in the Best New Zealand Poems series in 2002 and 2005. Her first collection of poetry, The Violinist in Spring, was published in 2006. Her first novel, The Chimes, was published in 2015 and was longlisted for the 2015 Man Booker Prize, but did not make the shortlist. She had been unaware that her publisher had submitted The Chimes for the award. The Chimes was awarded the World Fantasy Award for Best Novel in October 2016.

Smaill writes her work in longhand before typing it up. The collection of poems and her debut novel are the only two books published by Smaill so far; as of 2015, she had started writing a second novel.

Family
Smaill met the novelist Carl Shuker while studying at Victoria University. They married in 2010 and have one daughter.

References

External links
 Official website
 New Zealand Book Council website: author profile

Living people
1979 births
People from Auckland
New Zealand poets
New Zealand women novelists
World Fantasy Award-winning writers
University of Auckland alumni
International Institute of Modern Letters alumni
Alumni of University College London
Academics of the University of Hertfordshire